Farmington is a city in Washington County, Arkansas, United States. The community is nestled in a valley among the Boston Mountains, a subset of the Ozark Mountains. Although the first settlers came from the Deep South in 1828, the community did not incorporate until 1946. Located immediately west of Fayetteville in the Northwest Arkansas metropolitan statistical area, Farmington has been experiencing a population boom in recent years, as indicated by a 66% growth in population between the 2000 and 2010 censuses. It has been characterized as a bedroom community by the University of Arkansas Community Design Center.

History

Settlement through Civil War
The first settlers came from the Deep South in 1828, and the area was known as Engel's Mill until a post office was built in 1868 and the village was renamed. The Civil War had a great impact on the community, as  the area were mainly Confederates. The Battle of Prairie Grove occurred not far from Farmington, and the city was subject to raids by both armies as well as unaffiliated guerrillas and roughnecks.

The city was platted ca. 1870.

Reconstruction through present
Around the 1890s, residents found prosperity by growing strawberries and grapes and shipping them on the St. Louis–San Francisco Railway. The tracks were pulled up during World War II, something the company had wanted to do for years, under the guise of the war effort. Farmington was incorporated on October 15, 1946.

Geography
Farmington is located at  (36.042343, -94.245254).

Demographics

2020 census

As of the 2020 United States census, there were 7,584 people, 2,584 households, and 1,908 families residing in the city.

2000 census
As of the census of 2000, there were 3,605 people, 1,337 households, and 1,013 families residing in the city. The racial makeup of the city was 94.01% White, 0.64% Black or African American, 1.75% Native American, 0.25% Asian, 0.94% from other races, and 2.41% from two or more races.  2.19% of the population were Hispanic or Latino of any race.

There were 1,337 households, out of which 43.6% had children under the age of 18 living with them, 58.8% were married couples living together, 14.1% had a female householder with no husband present, and 24.2% were non-families. 19.1% of all households were made up of individuals, and 7.4% had someone living alone who was 65 years of age or older.  The average household size was 2.70 and the average family size was 3.09.

In the city, the population was spread out, with 30.7% under the age of 18, 10.3% from 18 to 24, 34.5% from 25 to 44, 16.1% from 45 to 64, and 8.4% who were 65 years of age or older.  The median age was 30 years. For every 100 females, there were 93.8 males.  For every 100 females age 18 and over, there were 85.3 males.

The median income for a household in the city was $38,969, and the median income for a family was $43,472. Males had a median income of $30,317 versus $21,250 for females. The per capita income for the city was $15,387.  About 5.2% of families and 7.5% of the population were below the poverty line, including 7.3% of those under age 18 and 12.1% of those age 65 or over.

Economy
Farmington borders Fayetteville to the west and sections of Fayetteville along Highway 16 are north of the city.

Culture, contemporary life, and points of interest

Annual cultural events
Farmington hosts annual events throughout the year.
FreedomFest celebrates the Independence Day holiday with food and drink, music, children's entertainment, and fireworks.
Back to School Bonanza is hosted by the Farmington United Methodist Church and provided dental screenings, clothing, food, and school supplies for students in preparation for the school year.
Farmington Fall Festival is held in Creekside Park and includes live music, pony rides, vendors, and an art show.
Farmington Christmas Parade happens every year towards the beginning of December. It includes the Farmington Crimson Regiment Marching Band currently directed by Jim Spillars, among other Christmas-related floats.
The Farmington Cardinals football team faces the Prairie Grove Tigers every year at the beginning of the football season, despite being in different conferences for the sake of time-honored rivalry. This event often draws hundreds of people from both towns and is popularly referred to as Battle of '62, after highway 62 connecting both towns.

Education

Farmington School District provides elementary and secondary to students in most areas. Farmington's comprehensive high school is Farmington Career Academies, more popularly referred to as Farmington Highschool. The mascot is the cardinal and their team colors are scarlet red and white.

A portion of Farmington is in the Prairie Grove School District and another portion is in the Fayetteville School District. Prairie Grove High School and Fayetteville High School are these districts' respective comprehensive high schools.

Farmington has two elementary schools, one intermediate (4/5th grade), one middle school (6/7th grade), one Junior High (8/9th), and one High School (Sophomore-Senior). Farmington High School moved into a new building in 2017, including a new Football Field and renovations on old school buildings.

Notable people
Sarah Colonna, American comedian, actress, best-selling author known for her work and appearances on E!’s Chelsea Lately

See also

 Farmington Township, Washington County, Arkansas
 Walnut Grove, Washington County, Arkansas, unincorporated community located south of Farmington on Highway 170

References

External links
 
 City of Farmington Arkansas Portal style website, Government, Business, Library, Recreation and more

Cities in Arkansas
Cities in Washington County, Arkansas
Northwest Arkansas
Populated places established in 1946
1946 establishments in Arkansas